Pinelands High School is a public English medium co-educational high school situated in Forest Drive, Pinelands in the city of Cape Town in the Western Cape province of South Africa. It was opened in July 1952 and the founding principal was  Jack Kent.  The school now enrolls approximately 980 students.

In 2004, the school provided filming locations for the motion picture Ask the Dust, with the sets built to simulate Los Angeles in the 1930s.

Academics

Grades 8 – 9

English Home Language, Afrikaans or isiXhosa First Additional Language, Mathematics, Creative Arts (Art, Music and Drama), Economic Management Sciences, Life Orientation, Natural Sciences, Social Sciences and Technology.

Grades 10 – 12

Compulsory:
English Home Language, Afrikaans or isiXhosa First Additional Language, Mathematics or Mathematical Literacy and Life Orientation.

Elective (minimum of three):
Accounting, Computer Applications Technology, Consumer Studies, Design (Surface and Textiles), Dramatic Arts, Engineering Graphics and Design, 
Geography, History, Information Technology, Life Sciences, Music, Physical Sciences, Tourism and Visual Arts.

Academic Extension Subjects (optional): 
Advanced Programme English, Advanced Programme Mathematics and IT.

Notable alumni
 Lesley-Ann Brandt, actress
 Tim Harrell, professional baseball pitcher who represented South Africa at the 2000 Summer Olympics
 Craig Matthews, South African cricket player
 Austin Smith, captain of the South African men's hockey team at the 2012 Summer Olympics in London

References

External links
Pinelands High School website

1952 establishments in South Africa
Educational institutions established in 1952
High schools in South Africa
Schools in Cape Town